The Falcons – better known by their Afrikaans name the Valke and now known as the Hino Valke for sponsorship reasons – are a South African rugby union team in Gauteng province that participates in the annual Currie Cup tournament.

Their home ground is Barnard Stadium in Kempton Park, to which they have returned in 2009.  The Falcons have operated from Bosman Stadium in Brakpan and Pam Brink Stadium in Springs.  They occasionally still host matches at Bosman Stadium.  The Falcons draw players from Ekurhuleni and other municipalities to the east and south of Johannesburg.

History
The Falcons Rugby Union was founded in 1947 as the Eastern Transvaal Rugby Football Union. After the 1995 World Cup, rugby was declared a professional sport in South Africa, after which the Eastern Transvaal Rugby Football Union merged with the Vaal Triangle Rugby Union to form the Gauteng Falcons Rugby Union. It is one of only fourteen Provincial Unions in the country.

Honours
In 2006 the Falcons were the Vodacom Cup champions, the first cup won in the history of the union.

Falcons Professional Rugby

Falcons Rugby (Pty) Ltd is the arm responsible for the Falcons Brand and the operation of the Professional Rugby Team, which competes in two high-profile competitions in South African Rugby:

 Currie Cup
 Vodacom Cup

Amateur Union

The Community Rugby arm, known historically as the Amateur Union, maintains the structure and development of the amateur Rugby set-up for the region, and includes:

 18 Clubs (approximately 2,000 players)
 54 High Schools
 101 Primary Schools
 80 registered referees
 and the structured development and transformation of Rugby in the region.

Current squad

The following players were included in the Falcons squad for the 2022 Currie Cup First Division:

See also
 Malaysia Valke

References

External links
 
 
 

South African rugby union teams
Sport in Gauteng
Kempton Park, Gauteng
Rugby clubs established in 1947